Adjutant Georges Pierre Blanc was a World War I flying ace credited with five aerial victories.

Biography

Called for military service on 10 October 1908, Blanc was posted to an infantry regiment. On 20 June 1915, he began pilot's training, receiving Military Pilot's Brevet No. 2232 on 31 December. After some intermediary postings, he arrived at Escadrille N31 on 31 March 1917. He would score five aerial victories with this squadron, and be promoted to Adjutant.

Sources of information

References
 

1887 births
1960 deaths
French World War I flying aces